Dr Chandreshwar Prasad Thakur or C. P. Thakur (born 3 September 1931) is a former member of Rajya Sabha, a former minister in the Government of India, a physician and a leader of Bharatiya Janata Party (BJP). He was a cabinet minister from 1999 to 2004 in the BJP government.

He is known for his contribution in finding medication for Kala-azar. He proposed the development of AIIMS hospital Patna in central government and got it approved. One Crossing (Chowk) near AIIMS hospital, Patna has been named " Dr C P Thakur Chowk " in honour of his contribution to Bihar and its people.

Early life 
Thakur was born on 3 September 1931 in Dubaha village of Muzaffarpur district in Bihar to Radhamohan Thakur and Sharda Thakur a Bhumihar Brahmin family. He is a physician and had received the degrees of M.B.B.S., M.D., M.R.C.P., F.R.C.P. from Patna Medical College, Patna University, Royal College of Physicians, London and Royal College of Physicians, Edinburgh and Royal College of Tropical Medicine and Hygiene, London. Thakur married Uma Thakur on 12 June 1957, with whom he has two sons and two daughters. Politician Vivek Thakur is his son.

Career 
As a physician, Thakur did extensive research for the treatment of Kala-azar. In 2017, he became the first Indian medical scientist to receive a lifetime achievement award from the World Health Organization.

He was elected to Lok Sabha from Patna constituency in 1984.

Positions held 
He has held the following government positions:

 1984 Elected to Eighth Lok Sabha 
 1990-91 Chairman, Kala-azar Spot Assessment Committee Government of India 
 1990-93 Member, Advisory Committee on Kala-azar Government of India 
 1991 Member, Expert Kala-azar committee to formulate prevention programme for Kala-azar, Government of India 
 1998 Member, Twelfth Lok Sabha (2nd term) 
 1998-99 Member, Committee on Science and Technology, Environment and Forests; and its Sub-Committee on Ganga Action Plan Member, Consultative Committee for the Ministry of External Affairs 
 1999 Member, Thirteenth Lok Sabha (3rd term) 
 22 Nov 1999-26 May 2000 Union Cabinet Minister, Water Resources 
 27 May 2000 – 30 June 2002 Union Cabinet Minister, Health and Family Welfare 
 29 Jan 2003-May 2004 Union Cabinet Minister, Small Scale Industries, Development of North-Eastern Region 
 April 2008 Elected to Rajya Sabha from Bihar 
 Aug. 2008 onwards Member, Committee on the Empowerment of Women 
 Aug. 2008- May 2009 Member, Committee on Information Technology 
 May 2009 onwards Member, Court of the Jawaharlal Nehru University 
 Aug. 2009 onwards Member, Committee on Chemicals and Fertilizers Member, Consultative Committee for the Ministry of Health and Family Welfare 
 Aug. 2012 onwards Member, Committee on Information Technology 
 Aug. 2012 onwards Member, Committee on Empowerment of Women
 Jan. 2016 onwards Chairman, The Scouts/Guides Organisation
March 2019 He was appointed Chancellor of Central University of South Bihar

Books published 

Dynamics of Development (Editor and Contributor);
Glimpses of Indian Technology (Co-author);
World Trade Organization (author);
Technical Report Series 791 up to 1990 (Geneva) Control of Leishmaniasis (joint author);
Recent Trends in Leishmania Research (contributor);
Text Book of Medicine—API Text Book of Medicine (Joint author);
India Under Atal Bihari Vajpayee, B.J.P. Era .

He has also published more than 100 research papers in medical journals and more than 200 articles in the press.

Awards 
 Padma Shri;
 Dr. B. C. Roy National Award, Indian Medical Council
 BKAIKET ORATION Award, Indian Council of Medical Research;
 P.N. Raju Oration Award (ICMR)

References

|-

|-

External links 
 biographical data from the Parliament of India
 

20th-century Indian medical doctors
Bharatiya Janata Party politicians from Bihar
Recipients of the Padma Shri in medicine
Living people
1931 births
Rajya Sabha members from Bihar
Lok Sabha members from Bihar
India MPs 1984–1989
India MPs 1998–1999
India MPs 1999–2004
People from Muzaffarpur district
Dr. B. C. Roy Award winners
Health ministers of India
Indian medical writers
Patna University alumni
Medical doctors from Bihar